DE37 may refer to:
 Delaware Route 37
 ROCS Shou Shan (DE-37)